Denis Parfenov (born 22 September 1987, Moscow) is a Russian political figure and a deputy of the 7th and 8th State Dumas.
 
In 2005, Parvenov joined the Russian Communist Youth League. Two years later, he became a member of the Communist Party of the Russian Federation. From 2009 to 2011, he worked at the Sberbank. From 2012 to 2016, he worked as an assistant to the deputy of the State Duma. In December 2014, he was elected Secretary of the Communist Party of the Russian Federation for agitation and propaganda. In 2016, he was elected deputy of the 7th State Duma. Since September 2021, he has served as deputy of the 8th State Duma from the Moscow constituency.

References
 

 

1987 births
Living people
Communist Party of the Russian Federation members
21st-century Russian politicians
Eighth convocation members of the State Duma (Russian Federation)
Seventh convocation members of the State Duma (Russian Federation)
Politicians from Moscow